The 2022 African U-17 Women's World Cup Qualifying Tournament was the 8th edition of the African U-17 Women's World Cup Qualifying Tournament, the biennial international youth football competition organised by the Confederation of African Football (CAF) to determine which women's under-17 national teams from Africa qualify for the FIFA U-17 Women's World Cup. Players born on or after 1 January 2005 were eligible to compete in the tournament.

Three teams qualified from this tournament for the 2022 FIFA U-17 Women's World Cup in India as the CAF representatives.

Draw
A total of 29 (out of 54) CAF member national teams entered the qualifying rounds. The draw was held on 10 May 2021 at the CAF headquarters in Cairo, Egypt. The draw procedures were as follows:
In the first round, the 10 teams were drawn into five ties, with teams divided into four pots based on their geographical zones and those in the same pot drawn to play against each other.
In the second round, the five first round winners and the 19 teams receiving byes to the second round were allocated into twelve ties based on the first round tie numbers, with five first round winners playing against the five teams receiving byes, and the other four first round winners playing against each other.
In the third round, the twelve second round winners were allocated into six ties based on the second round tie numbers.
In the fourth round, the six third round winners were allocated into three ties based on the third round tie numbers.

Table 

Notes
Teams in bold qualified for the final tournament.
(W): Withdrew after draw

Did not enter

Format
Qualification ties were played on a home-and-away two-legged basis. If the aggregate score was tied after the second leg, the away goals rule was applied, and if still tied, the penalty shoot-out (no extra time) was used to determine the winner.

Schedule

First round

{{TwoLegResult||||||—|—}}

|}

Second round

|}

Tanzania won 11–0 on aggregate.

3–3 on aggregate. Ethiopia won on away goals.
 

Nigeria won 8–0 on aggregate.

Guinea won 9–3 on aggregate.

Ghana won 4–0 on aggregate.

Morocco won 3–1 on aggregate.

Third round

|}

Cameroon won 5–0 on aggregate.

Tanzania won 5–2 on aggregate.

Ethiopia won 3–1 on aggregate.

Nigeria won 6–0 on aggregate.

Ghana won 10–1 on aggregate.

Morocco won 18–0 on aggregate.

Fourth round

|}

Tanzania won 5–1 on aggregate.

Nigeria won 1–0 on aggregate.

2–2 on aggregate. Morocco won 4–2 on penalties.

Qualified teams for FIFA U-17 Women's World Cup
The following three teams from CAF qualified for the 2022 FIFA U-17 Women's World Cup.

Goalscorers

See also 

2022 Africa Women Cup of Nations
2022 African U-20 Women's World Cup Qualifying Tournament

References

2022
Women's U-17 World Cup Qualifying Tournament
African U-17 World Cup Qualifying Tournament
African U-17 Women's World Cup Qualifying Tournament
2022 FIFA U-17 Women's World Cup qualification
March 2022 sports events in Africa